Pajarito Mountains or Sierra Pajaritos may refer to:

 Pajarito Mountains (Arizona), in the United States
 Pajarito Mountains (Chile)
 Pajarito Mountains (Nayarit), in Mexico
 Pajarito Mountains (Sonora), in Mexico